Thomas Albert Cropper (born June 20, 1959) is an American retired United States Navy rear admiral and academic administrator serving as president of the California State University Maritime Academy. Cropper was appointed on July 1, 2012 with the rank of honorary rear admiral in the U.S. Maritime Service.

Early life and education
Born in Maryland, Cropper earned a Bachelor of Arts in engineering operations from Iowa State University in 1981. He also earned a Master of Arts in aviations systems from the University of Tennessee and Master of Arts in world politics from the Catholic University of America. He is a distinguished graduate of the Naval War College, earning a third Master of Arts in national security and strategic studies.

Navy career

Operational assignments
Upon his graduation from Iowa State University, Cropper entered the navy as an ensign. During his thirty-one-year navy career, he served in a variety of command and staff positions. He was designated a naval aviator in 1982, followed by operational assignments with three aircraft carrier-based jet squadrons. He went on to serve as the commanding officer of an F/A-18 strikefighter squadron and as commander of the air wing aboard USS Nimitz. Cropper has embarked on eight extended deployments, on USS America (CV-66), USS Forrestal (CV-59), USS Enterprise (CVN-65), USS Eisenhower (CVN-69), and USS Nimitz (CVN-68) and flew nearly 5,000 hours in 43 different aircraft while logging over 1200 carrier arrested landings.

The PBS television series Carrier was filmed while Cropper commanded the air wing aboard the USS Nimitz, and he appears in several episodes.

Ashore
Cropper attended the U.S. Naval Test Pilot School, served as a military assistant in the Office of Secretary of Defense William Cohen, and as the Navy Federal Executive Fellow at the Brookings Institution. He also led "Strike University" at the Naval Strike and Air Warfare Center, served as chief of staff, U.S. Third Fleet, and headed the Joint Chiefs of Staff Working Group chartered with the development of national level security strategy.

Flag officer assignments
As a flag officer, Cropper served as Deputy Commander, U.S. Naval Forces Central Command, leading and managing over 24,000 people in combat operations as deputy commander, U.S. Naval Forces, U.S. Central Command. as well as Commander, Strike Force Training Pacific, where he directed education and at-sea training for navy ships and aviation squadrons deploying to the Western Pacific and the Middle East.

Retirement
He retired from the navy at the rank of rear admiral - lower half in 2012 and soon after assumed the duties as the CMA president.

Military awards
Rear Admiral Cropper's personal decorations include:

Dates of rank

Navy
 Ensign: 1981
 Lieutenant Junior Grade: 1983
 Lieutenant: 1985
 Lieutenant Commander: 1990
 Commander: 1996
 Captain: 2002
 Rear Admiral: 2007

Maritime Service
 Rear Admiral: July 1, 2012

References

External links

 A Message from President Cropper: Cal Maritime, Office of the President

1959 births
Living people
Iowa State University alumni
United States Naval Aviators
University of Tennessee alumni
Catholic University of America alumni
Naval War College alumni
Recipients of the Legion of Merit
United States Navy rear admirals (lower half)
Recipients of the Defense Superior Service Medal
California State University faculty